The Kennebec Highlands is a protected area in central Maine. 

It also includes land in Rome, Mount Vernon, and New Sharon. 
The area is roughly bounded by State Route 27, Watson Pond Rd., Belgrade Rd., and Kimball Pond Rd., plus extensions east of Watson Pond Rd. to Long Pond. 
It takes its name from its hills, which include McGaffey Mountain, the  summit of which is the highest point of Kennebec County. 

The Belgrade Regional Conservation Alliance (BRCA) began the effort to protect the area from development in 1999, assisted by a grant from the Land for Maine's Future (LMF) Program. 

Notes 

Protected areas of Franklin County, Maine
Protected areas of Kennebec County, Maine
Highlands